Ingebrigt Håker Flaten (born 23 September 1971 in Oppdal, Norway) is a Norwegian bassist active in the jazz and free jazz genres.

Career 

Flaten played electric bass in local funk trio Neon (1990), and studied on the Jazz program at Trondheim Music Conservatory (1992–94). He was involved in several groups from the first year at NTNU, including Trondhjems Kunstorkester, To brumbasser og en bi, and the successful group The Source. With the latter Ornette Coleman inspired band he recorded records Olemanns kornett (1994) and "... of Christmas' (1995), toured in northern Europe and had a festival gigs together with such different constellations as Motor Psycho and Cikada Quartet (both in 1995). Already in 1993 he was part of jamkompet at Kongsberg Jazz Festival.

To brumbasser og en bi was later better known as Maria Kannegaard Trio. From 1994 he had a duo with Michael Bloch, and became a member of "Jax" from the same year, including festival gigs in Oslo and Moldejazz. He attended the Bugge Wesseltoft's album New Conception of Jazz (1995–96), and from 1995 he was a member of two successful groups, the Paul Bley inspired trio Close Erase, with recording 1995 1998, 2001 and 2006. He also appeared on tours and festivals, as well as re-release 2010, "R.I.P. Complete Recordings 1995–2007, and the Coltrane inspired quartet Element.

In the winter of 1995–96 Flaten moved to Oslo and this led to many new involvements, like Acidband, SAN: Song (1996), Oslo Groove Company, YoungLove, and not least the super trio with Petter Wettre (1996–), usually just called The Trio: Meet the locals (1998), In color (1999) and Mystery unfolds (2001), Tour de force with Petter Wettre/Dave Liebman (2000). Moreover, his authoritative bass have been listening to records with Sigurd Køhn (1996), Eivind Aarset (1997), Jazzmob (1998), Bugge Wesseltoft's Sharing (1998), Moving (2001) and Live (2000–02), Didrik Ingvaldsen (2000), two albums with the band School Days (2000 and 2001), seven albums with The Thing, a trio with Mats Gustafsson and Paal Nilssen-Love (2001), Live at Blå (2003), Action jazz (2005), Now and forever (2005), Immediate sound with Ken Vandermark (2007) and Bag it! (2008), No Spaghetti Edition (2001) and og Atomic: Feet music (2001), Boom Boom (2002), The Bikini tapes (2004), Happy new ears! (2005), Retrograde (2007–08) and Theater Tilters, vol 1–2 (2010).

New recordings coming, like The Electrics (2002) and The Scorch Trio (with Raoul Björkenheim og Paal Nilssen-Love) 2002 og 2004, Brolt! (2008) and Melaza (2010). In 2003 he released his solo album Double bass, and the same year he participated on the record Bjørn Johansen in memoriam and the fusjon of Atomic and Schooldays released in the album Nuclear assembly hall, followed by Distil (Chicago 2006). A record with Bugge Wesseltoft New Conception of Jazz released in 2004, the same year as he was awarded Vitalprisen at Kongsberg Jazzfestival. In 2011 was published the record My heart always wanders, which he did with Håkon Kornstad and Jon Christensen, from the same year he contributed on the Ola Kvernberg's record Liarbird receiving Spellemannprisen 2011.

Flaten runs the annual Sonic Transmissions Festival, a festival in Austin, TX devoted to hybrid free-jazz forms.

Honors 
2004: Kongsberg Jazz Award

Selected projects 
Atomic
Element
The Thing
Scorch Trio
Ingebrigt Håker Flaten Quintet

Major collaborators 
Ken Vandermark
Joe McPhee
Paal Nilssen-Love
Bugge Wesseltoft
Håvard Wiik
Ola Kvernberg

Discography 

 Solo albums
 2003: Double Bass (Sofa)
 2012: Birds - Solo Electric (Tektite Records Co.Operative)
 2012: Steel - Live In Bucharest (Tektite Records Co.Operative)

 With Ingebrigt Håker Flaten Quintet
 2006: Quintet(Jazzland Rec/Universal)
 2008: The Year Of The Boar (Jazzland Rec/Universal)

References

External links 

1971 births
Living people
People from Oppdal
Musicians from Oppdal
Jazz double-bassists
Norwegian jazz upright-bassists
Male double-bassists
Norwegian jazz composers
Norwegian University of Science and Technology alumni
Jazzland Recordings (1997) artists
Rune Grammofon artists
21st-century double-bassists
21st-century Norwegian male musicians
Atomic (band) members
Petter Wettre Quartet members
Close Erase members
The Source (band) members
The Thing (jazz band) members
NoBusiness Records artists
Okka Disk artists